Ankit Gera is an Indian actor recognized for his roles in several television soaps. He was a contestant on Bigg Boss 9.

Personal life
Gera completed his studies in Delhi.

He was in a relationship with the actress Adaa Khan, but they broke up in 2013. Later, he was in a relationship with his Sapne Suhane Ladakpan Ke co-star Roopal Tyagi before they broke up in 2015. In 2019, he began dating the actress Sara Khan with whom he did a guest appearance in Santoshi Maa.

Career
After completing his studies, Gera began his acting career in Hindi television with the rom-com Mahi Way on Sony Entertainment Television.

His first big part was in 2009 in the television show Mann Kee Awaaz Pratigya as Adarsh Saxena which he left in 2011 and was replaced by Aniruddh Singh.

His first lead role came opposite Roopal Tyagi in 2012 in Zee TV's soap opera Sapne Suhane Ladakpan Ke as Mayank Garg, for which he received several nominations. The show ended in 2015.

In 2015, he took part in Killer Karaoke Atka Toh Latkah. That year he appeared as Bhasmasur in the fantasy action series Maharakshak: Devi on Zee TV that failed commercially.

In October 2015, Gera was a celebrity contestant in the 9th season of popular Indian reality game show Bigg Boss. He was evicted on Day 7.

In 2006, he was seen as Atish in an episode of Yeh Hai Aashiqui with Pooja Sharma. In the same year, he gave a guest appearance in &TV's mythological drama Santoshi Maa produced by Rashmi Sharma Telefilms with his girlfriend, Sara Khan.

In March 2017, Gera began as the main character alongside Yukti Kapoor and Simraan Kaur in the TV series Agniphera as MBA graduate Anurag Singh. He left the show in 2018, after his character's death.

Television

References

External links
Ankit Gera news at Oneindia

Indian male television actors
Living people
Bigg Boss (Hindi TV series) contestants
Year of birth missing (living people)